Jacqueline Soames (born 30 September 1968) is a British former competitive figure skater. Competing in pairs with John Jenkins, she finished 15th at the 1994 Winter Olympics. Earlier, she competed in ladies' singles, finishing 18th at the 1989 European Championships and twice winning silver at the British Championships.

Results

Pairs career with Jenkins

Singles career

References

British female single skaters
British female pair skaters
Figure skaters at the 1994 Winter Olympics
Olympic figure skaters of Great Britain
1968 births
Living people
Sportspeople from Nuneaton